Sebastián Decoud (born 18 September 1981) is a professional Argentine tennis player.

Tennis career
Decoud was born in Curuzú Cuatiá, Argentina. He starting playing tennis relatively late, taking it up as a 10-year-old.

Juniors
In his brief career as a junior, he lost his only matches against future top pros Guillermo Coria and Nicolas Mahut, split his two matches with Paul-Henri Mathieu, and won his only encounter with Boris Pašanski.

Decoud reached as high as No. 32 in the junior world singles rankings in 1999.

2000 to 2006
Decoud began playing professionally in 2000, but he progressed very slowly as a pro player.  
He broke into the top-400 in the world for the first time late in 2006 as a 25-year-old, finishing the year ranked #384.

2007
Decoud made more career progress in 2007, finishing the year at #289.  He had moderate success in Futures and Challenger tournaments, and got his ranking high enough to try qualifying at two ATP stops in July, but lost both matches.

2008
Decoud won his first ATP match as a 26-year-old in February 2008 in Brazil.  After qualifying into the main draw, he took out #50 José Acasuso in the first round, but then lost to #112 Nicolás Lapentti.  That got his ranking to a career-high of #254.  

He retired in qualifying the next week in Buenos Aires, with an injury that kept him off the tour for 3 months.  But he came back strong in his next two matches, in the qualifying for the French Open, beating #124 Christophe Rochus and making his first Grand Slam main draw as a Lucky loser after losing in the final qualifying round.

Performance timeline

Singles

ATP Challenger and ITF Futures finals

Singles: 22 (16–6)

Doubles: 39 (20–19)

References

External links 
 
 
 Decoud world ranking history

1981 births
Living people
People from Curuzú Cuatiá
Argentine people of French descent
Argentine male tennis players
Tennis players from Buenos Aires
Competitors at the 1998 South American Games
South American Games gold medalists for Argentina
South American Games medalists in tennis